Chen Menglei (1650-1741) was a Qing dynasty scholar-writer known for being the chief editor, compiler, and author of the Gujin Tushu Jicheng Chinese encyclopedia. In 1670, he became a Jinshi. Chen Menglei conducted research for over 50 years, covering more than 10,000 volumes of books, and in 1701 was entrusted by the Kangxi Emperor to compile the Gujin Tushu Jicheng encyclopedia, which Chen completed in four and a half years. 

Chen Menglei also had the courtesy name Zezhen (则震), sobriquet or art name Shengzhai (省斋), and epithet "Pine Crane Elder" (松鶴老人).

Life 
Chen Menglei was born in modern day Fuzhou in Houguan county. In the ninth year of Kangxi (1670), at the age of 20, he obtained his scholar degree, became a Jinshi, and was selected as a scholar for the Hanlin Academy. In the 12th year of Kangxi's reign (1673), he returned to his hometown to visit his relatives, which coincided with the Revolt of the Three Feudatories, and he was caught in the midst of Geng Jingzhong's rebellion. Chen Menglei at the time was friends with fellow writer Li Guangdi. Chen Sui (陈遂) and Li Guangdi together went to the office of Fujian chancellor Fu Hongji (富鴻基) to demonstrate their loyalty to the Qing dynasty.

In the 15th year of Kangxi (1676), in September, the Qing soldiers passed through Xianxia pass (仙霞关) to enter Fujian, and Geng Jingzhong surrendered. At this time, as part of machinations by Li Guangdi, Menglei was framed and falsely accused by Xu Hongbi (徐鴻弼) from the Geng faction. Chen Menglei was mistakenly taken for Chen Fang (陳昉). But later Chen Menglei cleared his name and showed his innocence.

Writing the Gujin Tushu Jicheng 
In the thirty-seventh year of Kangxi (1698), Emperor Kangxi made an eastern tour, and Chen Menglei went to work and study with the third son of Emperor Kangxi: Prince Cheng, Yinzhi. Chen Menglei's study was changed to "Songheshan Room" (松鶴山房), and he called himself "Songhe Elder" (松鶴老人), meaning "Pine Crane Elder" as the Kangxi emperor gave the couplet "The pine is tall and the branches and leaves are luxuriant, while the old crane has new feathers."

During this period, in October of the 40th year of Kangxi (1701), Chen began to compile the book, the Compendium, or Tushu Huibian (图书汇编). Chen Menglei referred to the "Xieyitang" (协一堂) book collection and more than 15,000 volumes of ancient books in his own family to classify and edit the encyclopedia. After five years (1701-1705) of 'eye to eye inspection, morning and evening' (“目营手检，无间晨夕”), in May of the 44th year of Kangxi, he completed the Compendium.

There are 10,000 volumes of the book and 40 volumes of catalogues, with a total of 160 million words. The whole book is divided into six parts: Astronomy/Calendar, Geography, Society, Nature, Philosophy, Economics, etc. (历象、方舆、明论、博物、理学、经济等). Each edition is divided into several codices, totaling 36 codices, and each codex is divided into cadres, totaling 6,109. There are many contents, and the classification is clear.

In the 45th year of Kangxi (1706), the first draft was completed, and after the Kangxi emperor inspected it, he changed the title from Compendium to the Gujin Tushu Jicheng (古今图书集成), literally a 'compilation of ancient and modern books'. When the Yongzheng Emperor ascended the throne, he ordered Jiang Tingxi to help Chen Menglei finish completing the encyclopedia. In 1934, the Zhonghua Book Company (中华书局) published copies of the encyclopedia signing Chen Menglei's name.

Zhang Tingyu commented: "Since the book contract was established, one book has been used throughout the past and the present, covering everything, and there is no one like the author of Gujin Tushu Jicheng." 

In Chen Menglei's "Songheshan Fangji" (《松鹤山房集》), Volume 2, "Starting the Compendium" (《进汇编启》 jin huibian qi), it is mentioned that in this great book "everything across the country, including Thirteen Classics and the 21 Histories, was covered. Almost nothing was left out from the collection of ancient history except maybe one or two words deleted."

In the 61st year of Kangxi (1722), the Kangxi emperor died. Chen Menglei continued to study with Prince Cheng, Yinzhi. However the incoming Yongzheng emperor had been opposed by Yinzhi, and in January of the 1st year of Yongzheng (1723), Chen Menglei and his two children moved to Heilongjiang, having been exiled by the new emperor. At this time, Chen Menglei was 74 years old. In the 6th year of Qianlong Emperor (1741), Chen Menglei died of illness in a garrison, aged 92.

Works 

 Gujin Tushu Jicheng
 Gaodu Chenghuangwen (《告都城隍文》), July 1680: on City God (China)

References

Further reading 

 

Hokkien people
1650 births
1741 deaths
Qing dynasty writers
Qing dynasty philosophers
17th-century Chinese historians
17th-century Chinese philosophers
17th-century Chinese writers
Writers from Fujian
Philosophers from Fujian